Magic in Your Eyes may refer to:

 "Magic in Your Eyes" (song), a 2004 song by Tomoko Kawase under the name Tommy february6
 Magic in Your Eyes (album), a 1978 album by Earl Klugh